The Daughters of Cain is a crime novel by Colin Dexter. It is the eleventh novel in the Inspector Morse series.

Synopsis
The body of Dr Felix McClure, Ancient History don of Wolsey College, Oxford, is found in his flat. A brutal murder – a single stab to the stomach with a broad knife. The police have no weapon, no suspect and no motive. The case leads Morse into the path of Edward Brooks, who himself disappears following a museum theft. Then the weapon is found and there are suddenly too many suspects.

Adaptations

This novel was adapted for television in the Inspector Morse series, airing as The Daughters of Cain, the second episode in series 8 in 1996. The main roles of the detectives were the same actors as throughout the series, John Thaw as Detective Chief Inspector Morse and Kevin Whately as Detective Sergeant Lewis.

Publication history
1994, London: Macmillan , Pub date 11 November 1994, Hardback

References

Further reading 
 Bishop, David, The Complete Inspector Morse: From the Original Novels to the TV Series London: Reynolds & Hearn (2006)

External links

1994 British novels
Novels by Colin Dexter
Novels set in Oxford
British novels adapted into television shows
Macmillan Publishers books